Wajo may refer to:

 Wajo Regency, a regency of South Sulawesi province of Indonesia.
 Wajo Kingdom, an elective monarchy founded in the fifteenth century in the south of Sulawesi.
 A Japanese terminology (和城) for Japanese castle.
 WJUS, a radio station (1310 AM) in Marion, Alabama, United States, known as WAJO from 1983 to 1998